The eastern dwarf galagos are a group of seven species of strepsirrhine primates of the family Galagidae, native to East Africa. They were formerly classified in the genus Galagoides but have been moved to their own genus, Paragalago, based on genetic evidence, and supported by differences in vocalizations and morphology. The three western/Congolian species remain in Galagoides. The most recently discovered species, the Rungwe dwarf galago, has yet to be formally named and described.

The two genera are not sister taxa and thus apparently evolved their small sizes and some morphological similarities  via parallel evolution, although members of the eastern group tend to be larger. They are separated by the East African Rift. Paragalago is actually sister to the genus of 'lesser galagos', Galago, which are similar in size. There is limited sympatry between Paragalago and the much more widely distributed Galago. Paragalago members range in mass from 60 to 250 g, considered small to medium-sized among galagids.

Of those whose conservation status has been evaluated by the IUCN, P. orinus is considered to be near threatened and P. rondoensis to be critically endangered, while P. cocos, P. granti and P. zanzibaricus are of least concern.

The Taita mountain dwarf galago, found in the Taita Hills, is unclassified. Based on vocalizations, it may be the Kenya coast galago. These dwarf galagos are present in very small forest fragments and are in immediate danger of extinction.

Paragalago species
 Kenya coast galago — P. cocos
 Grant's bushbaby — P. granti
 Malawi bushbaby — P. nyasae
 Uluguru bushbaby — P. orinus
 Rondo dwarf galago — P. rondoensis
 Rungwe dwarf galago – P. sp. nov.
 Zanzibar bushbaby — P. zanzibaricus

External links

More information about dwarf galagos of Taita Hills, Kenya on website animalstaita.com 
IUCN Red List assessments of Paragalagos

References

Galagidae
Galagos
Primates of Africa
Taxa described in 2017